Middle Fork Township is a former township in Forsyth County, North Carolina, United States. The township had a population of 6,779 according to the 2000 census. In 2003, Middle Fork Township split into Middle Fork I Township and Middle Fork II Township.

Geographically, Middle Fork Township occupied  in central Forsyth County.  Much of Middle Fork Township consists of the town of Walkertown.  Additionally, much of the original township has been annexed by the City of Winston-Salem and made part of Winston Township.

References

Townships in Forsyth County, North Carolina
Townships in North Carolina